Adagio (Italian for 'slowly') may refer to:

Music
 Adagio, a tempo marking, indicating that music is to be played slowly, or a composition intended to be played in this manner
 Adagio (band), a French progressive metal band

Albums
 Adagio (Sweetbox album)
 Adagio (Solitude Aeturnus album)

Songs
 Adagio in C Minor, by Nicholas Britell for the TV series Succession
 Adagio for Strings, by Samuel Barber
 Adagio in G minor, attributed to Tomaso Albinoni, composed by Remo Giazotto
 "Adagio" (Lara Fabian song), from the 2000 album Lara Fabian
 performed by Dimash Kudaibergen
 Adagio for Strings (Tiësto), a 2005 cover of Barber's Adagio by Tiësto
 "Adagio in D Minor" (John Murphy song), from the soundtrack to the 2007 film Sunshine
 "Adagio", by Epica, on the 2008 The Classical Conspiracy album
 "Adagio For TRON", from the 2010 TRON: Legacy soundtrack, by Daft Punk
 "Adagio", by Secret Garden, on the 1996 album Songs from a Secret Garden
 "Adagio in C Minor", by Yanni, from the 1997 album Tribute
 “Adagio”, by Safri Duo, from the 2001 album Episode II

Human motion
 Adagio (acrobatics), a form of acrobalance found in circus and dance
 Adagio (ballet technique)

Other uses
 Adagio (film), a 2000 Russian film
 Adagio (hotel), an apartment hotel brand
 Adagio Dazzle, a character in the movie My Little Pony: Equestria Girls – Rainbow Rocks
 Adagio, a playable half-angel half-dragon character in the video game Vainglory

See also
 Adagio for Strings (disambiguation)